Haltingen station is a railway station in the town of Weil am Rhein, in Baden-Württemberg, Germany. It is located on the Mannheim–Karlsruhe–Basel railway (Rhine Valley Railway) of Deutsche Bahn. The Kander Valley Railway heritage railway operates from a platform just north of the station.

Services
 the following services stop at Haltingen:

References

External links
 
 Haltingen layout 
 

Railway stations in Baden-Württemberg
Buildings and structures in Lörrach (district)